Jesús Aguirre y Ortiz de Zárate, Duke consort of Alba (9 June 1934 – 11 May 2001) was a Spanish intellectual, Jesuit priest, literary editor, and aristocrat. After leaving the priesthood, he became the literary editorial director of Taurus Publishing and later held the position of Director General of Music in the Spanish Ministry of Culture from 1977 to 1980. He was married to Cayetana Fitz-James Stuart, 18th Duchess of Alba and head of the House of Alba. In 1986, he went on to occupy Chair "F" of the Royal Spanish Academy, replacing Manuel de Terán Álvarez.

Early life and priesthood
Jesús Aguirre was born on 9 June 1934 in  Madrid, Spain. He spent most of his childhood in Santander. He began his priestly career at Comillas Pontifical University, Madrid, graduating with a degree in philosophy. In 1956, he went to Munich to study theology under Gottlieb Söhngen, at the same time as Cardinal Ratzinger was there. It was in Munich that he made contact with the survivors of Critical School, and was a speaker at the first meetings between Marxists and Christians.

In 1958, during his vacation to Spain, he joined the People's Liberation Front, and in 1962 he served as a pastor to the Church of the City University of Madrid. When he left the priesthood in 1969, he wrote "Sermones en España" ["Sermons in Spain"]. It was initially banned in Francoist Spain. The ban was lifted in 1971, a year and a half later.

During his time as a priest, he worked for Taurus Publishing House, first as a translator and editor of religious publications, eventually becoming editor-in-chief, becoming a personal friend of many Spanish writers and politicians. As editor in chief, he was largely responsible for the translation and/or edition of a significant number of the works of the Frankfurt School.

Secular life and marriage

During his time at Taurus, Aguirre met Cayetana Fitz-James Stuart, 18th Duchess of Alba, and decided to leave the priesthood to be able to marry her. The cabinet of Spain subsequently appointed him Director General of music at the Ministry of Culture, where he served from 8 September 1977 to 25 January 1980. On 16 March 1978 he married Cayetana Fitz-James, Duchess of Alba, whom he had met four months before. 
In 1981, he was elected president of the board of directors of Zoilo Ruiz-Mateos SA and he also became the director of the Bank Atlantic. Both organizations belonged to the business group Rumasa. These were positions he held until 1983, when he was elected to be a member of the Royal Academy of Fine Arts of San Fernando. In 1986 he became the Chair "F" of the Royal Spanish Academy. He was also elected to be Commissioner of the Universal Exposition of 1992 in Sevilla, and in December 1985 he became a member of the Real Academia Sevillana de Buenas Letras.

Death 
On 12 January 2001 Aguirre entered the clinic of la Luz (Madrid) due to a localized laryngeal cancer. At 17:15 on 11 May he died from a pulmonary embolism in the Palace of Liria. He was buried in the family vault of the House of Alba in the Monastery of the Immaculate Conception at Loeches. The funeral was conducted by the parish priest of the village.

Awards and distinctions
Grand Cross of the Civil Order of Alfonso X, the Wise
Grand Cross of the German Civil Merit
First gold medal Manuel de Falla
Honorary mayor of San Antonio, (Texas, United States)
Knight of the Sovereign Military Order of Malta
President of the National Association of Newspaper Libraries.
Vice-patron of the Royal Association of British Hispanic United World Colleges.
Fellow of the International Institute for Prehistoric Research(Chicago, United States)
Member of the European Association of Culture(Venice, Italy)

Published works by Jesús Aguirre
 Sermones en España (1971)
 Casi ayer noche (1985)
 Altas opportunidades (1987) 
 Memorias del cumplimiento (1988)
 Las horas situadas (1989)
 Crónica en la comisaría (1992)

Published works about Jesús Aguirre
 Caballero Rodríguez, Beatriz. 2013. Against Instrumental Reason: Neo-Marxism and Spirituality in the Thought of J.L.L. Aranguren and J. Aguirre. Anagnórisis.
 Vicent, Manuel. 2011. Aguirre, el magnífico. Madrid: Alfaguara.

References

1934 births
2001 deaths
People from Madrid
Former Jesuits
Laicized Roman Catholic priests
Members of the Royal Spanish Academy
Dukes of Alba
Recipients of the Civil Order of Alfonso X, the Wise
Comillas Pontifical University alumni
Deaths from laryngeal cancer